The Wrecking Crew is a team of four supervillains—the Wrecker, Bulldozer, Piledriver and Thunderball—appearing in American comic books published by Marvel Comics. While not featured on the cover, the Wrecking Crew's first appearance is in The Defenders #17 (Nov 1974).

The Wrecking Crew appear in the Marvel Cinematic Universe / Disney+ series She-Hulk: Attorney at Law (2022).

Fictional team history
The Wrecking Crew are formed when Dirk Garthwaite—the Wrecker—is approached by Dr. Eliot Franklin in prison and asked to retrieve a gamma bomb Franklin had designed, with the intent of ransoming New York for millions of dollars. The Wrecker had formerly been a violent criminal who demolished crime scenes with his crowbar, but gained his power when he was mistaken for Loki and given mystical powers by Karnilla the Norn Queen. Garthwaite manages to retrieve his enchanted crowbar. During a lightning storm, Wrecker tells Franklin and fellow prisoners Henry Camp and Brian Calusky to grip the weapon simultaneously. A lightning bolt then strikes the crowbar, increases the Wrecker's power and transforms him and the other three men into the Wrecking Crew. Franklin became Thunderball, Camp became Bulldozer, and Caluski became Piledriver. They promptly escape from prison and, in the course of searching for the gamma bomb, are defeated by the Defenders and Luke Cage.

Over the years the Wrecking Crew have followed a very familiar cycle—escape from prison, fight (and subsequently lose to) superheroes, and be returned to prison. The Wrecking Crew have battled the Avengers, the Fantastic Four, Captain America, Iron Fist, the Runaways, Spider-Man, Namor the Sub-Mariner, Doctor Strange, Daredevil, Alpha Flight, the She-Hulk and the X-Men, but their main foe is Thor. When the Wrecking Crew first battle Thor, they are confident that it will be a quick victory. Thor, however, infuriated by the fact that one of the Wrecker's offensives has killed an innocent bystander, defeats them all in moments and critically injures the Wrecker. Thunderball escapes and, several weeks later, recovers the Wrecker's crowbar, going on to form his own gang before being defeated by Spider-Man. The Wrecking Crew is later chosen by the being known as the Beyonder to participate in the Secret Wars against a team of select superheroes. The Wrecking Crew's most notorious act was to participate in the near-fatal beating of the hero Hercules during a siege of Avengers Mansion by the fourth incarnation of Masters of Evil led by Baron Helmut Zemo. With Thor's assistance, Hercules eventually confronts the Wrecking Crew and defeats them, restoring his confidence in himself. The Wrecking Crew were briefly joined by Piledriver's son Excavator who helped them in their fight against the Runaways. The Wrecking Crew was imprisoned in the Raft when Electro freed the inmates in the New Avengers.

During the Civil War crossover event, the Wrecking Crew is forced to join the Thunderbolts Army or face additional jail time. The Wrecking Crew later escape to Canada to avoid the Superhuman Registration Act. The Wrecking Crew's most despicable act was murdering nearly everyone inside a Canadian bar all because of an "annoying" cell phone ringtone. They then join forces with the mythical Great Beasts and battle the superhero team Omega Flight. After being defeated by Omega Flight, they are imprisoned in a jail in Manitoba, but manage to escape and return to the United States, where they are recruited to join the Hood's crime syndicate. The Wrecking Crew were later hired by Jigsaw to kill the Punisher during Jigsaw's revenge plot against him. However, before the Wrecker can deliver the final blow, he is defeated by the Rhino, who owed the Punisher a favor after he spared the Rhino's life. During the "Secret Invasion" storyline, the Wrecking Crew are among the many supervillains who rejoined the Hood's crime syndicate and attacked an invading Skrull force.

At the time when Bulldozer died of an unknown cause, his daughter Marci became the second Bulldozer. During the Avengers: Standoff! storyline, Wrecker, Piledriver, and a somehow-revived Bulldozer appear as inmates of Pleasant Hill, a gated community established by S.H.I.E.L.D. During the "Search for Tony Stark" story arc, the Wrecking Crew rejoin the Hood's gang as they attack Castle Doom. The Wrecking Crew later joined Baron Zemo's third incarnation of the Masters of Evil. The Hydra Supreme version of Captain America persuaded Zemo to have the Masters of Evil be part of Hydra's Army of Evil by the time of Hydra's takeover of the United States. The Wrecking Crew were hired by Mayor Wilson Fisk to demolish P.S. 20. As Thunderball was unavailable, they gained Demolisher as a substitute member. The Wrecking Crew were defeated by Moon Girl and Devil Dinosaur. During the "Devil's Reign" storyline, the Wrecking Crew were shown as inmates of the Myrmidon. When 8-Ball offered to sit with them, they turn him down.

Membership

Current members
 Wrecker (Dirk Garthwaite) — The team's leader wields an indestructible crowbar with magical properties. He both hates and fears Thor.
 Bulldozer I (Henry Camp) — Bulldozer I has an armored metal helmet and fights by ramming his victims head-first. 
 Piledriver (Brian Philip Calusky) — Piledriver fights with his oversized pile-driving fists.
 Thunderball (Dr. Eliot Franklin) — Thunderball is the thinker of the team and wields a huge demolition ball on a chain.

Former members
 Excavator (Ricky Calusky) — The teenage son of Piledriver and a temporary member. The Excavator wielded an enchanted shovel that broke in his very first battle when he smashed it over Molly Hayes' head (which only irritated the young mutant girl).
 Bulldozer II (Marci Camp) — Marci Camp is the daughter of Henry Camp, the original Bulldozer, who inherited the villain's powers as well as his training. She now works alongside her father.
 Demolisher (real name unknown) - A female mercenary who filled in for Thunderball as a member of the Wrecking Crew when they were working on a job for Mayor Wilson Fisk.

Reception
 In 2022, Screen Rant included The Wrecking Crew in their "10 Most Powerful Hercules Villains In Marvel Comics" list.

Other versions

Marvel Zombies
In Marvel Zombies vs. Army of Darkness, Thunderball is seen fighting Daredevil, whom he defeats with the help of Ash Williams (who mistakenly believed Daredevil to be the villain). Later, Thunderball is attempting to fight off several zombies, including infected versions of the Wrecker, Bulldozer and Piledriver. The Punisher comes upon the scene and shoots Thunderball dead, then directs his attention to the zombies. The remaining members of the Wrecking Crew are subsequently among the zombies who attack and infect the Punisher.

Ultimate Marvel
The Ultimate Wrecking Crew initially appear in Ultimate Spider-Man as a clean-up crew for super-human battles, as employees of Damage Control. They then briefly appear in Ultimate Hulk Annual fighting Zarda after gaining the costumes, weapons and powers of their mainstream counterparts and seizing the Flatiron Building. It is unknown how or why they acquired their costumes, weapons and powers, as well as the change in their behavior.

JLA/Avengers
The Wrecking Crew have a brief appearance in the last issue of JLA/Avengers as a part of Krona's army, being single-handedly taken down by Wonder Woman.

In other media

Television
 The Wrecking Crew appear in The Super Hero Squad Show episode "To Err is Superhuman!", with Wrecker, Bulldozer, Piledriver, and Thunderball voiced by Charlie Adler, Roger Rose, Travis Willingham, and Alimi Ballard respectively. This version of the group are members of Doctor Doom's Lethal Legion.
 The Wrecking Crew appear in The Avengers: Earth's Mightiest Heroes, with Wrecker, Bulldozer, Piledriver, and Thunderball voiced by JB Blanc, James C. Mathis III, Nolan North, and Gary Anthony Williams respectively.
 The Wrecking Crew appeared in the Ultimate Spider-Man episode "Damage", with Wrecker, Bulldozer, Piledriver, and Thunderball voiced by John DiMaggio, Kevin Michael Richardson, Cam Clarke, and Chi McBride respectively.
 The Wrecking Crew appear in Avengers Assemble, with Wrecker and Piledriver voiced again by John DiMaggio and Cam Clarke respectively while Bulldozer and Thunderball are voiced by Travis Willingham and Fred Tatasciore respectively.
 The Wrecking Crew appear in the Hulk and the Agents of S.M.A.S.H., with Wrecker voiced by Steve Blum in "The Skaar Whisperer" and Fred Tatasciore in "The Big Green Mile", Bulldozer voiced by Benjamin Diskin in "The Skaar Whisperer" and "The Big Green Mile", Piledriver voiced by Jonathan Adams in "The Big Green Mile", and Thunderball voiced by Fred Tatasciore in "The Skaar Whisperer" and Jonathan Adams in "The Big Green Mile".
 The Wrecking Crew appear in the Marvel Disk Wars: The Avengers episode "Mutant Girl Awakening".
 The Wrecking Crew appear in the Disney+ / Marvel Cinematic Universe series She-Hulk: Attorney at Law episode "The People vs. Emil Blonsky", with the Wrecker and Thunderball portrayed by Nick Gomez and Justin Eaton respectively while Piledriver and Bulldozer are portrayed by uncredited actors. This version of the group wield Asgardian construction equipment, with Bulldozer wearing a helmet and Piledriver wearing a pair of gloves while Wrecker and Thunderball retain their tools.

Video games
 The Wrecking Crew appear as a collective boss in Marvel: Ultimate Alliance, with Wrecker voiced by Dave Wittenberg, Bulldozer voiced by James Arnold Taylor, Piledriver voiced by Michael Gough, and Thunderball voiced by Fred Tatasciore. This version of the group are members of Doctor Doom's Masters of Evil.
 The Wrecking Crew appear as a collective boss in Marvel: Avengers Alliance.

References

External links
 

Marvel Comics supervillain teams
Comics characters introduced in 1974
Villains in animated television series
Characters created by Len Wein
Characters created by Sal Buscema
Thor (Marvel Comics)